Léon Delafosse (1874  1951) was a French composer and pianist. His musical works included études, arabesques, waltzes and nocturnes. It has been claimed that he was the model for the character of Charles Morel, a violinist portrayed in Marcel Proust's novel In Search of Lost Time.

Delafosse was also painted as the subject of a portrait by John Singer Sargent.  currently resides in the Seattle Art Museum. Sargent had also dedicated "The Grand Canal Venice" to Delafosse, writing in the inscription "à Léon Delafosse en toute admiration et amitié".

Biography 

Delafosse was born poor. His mother was a concierge, who also taught him piano as a child. Delafosse became a student of Antoine François Marmontel (1850-1907) at the Conservatoire de Paris. He gave his first recital at the age of seven, and won first prize at the Conservatoire at age 13. He subsequently became the protégé of the poet Robert de Montesquiou (1855-1921), the countess Metternich and the princess Rachel de Brancovan. He gave recitals, but also wrote compositions for piano, including Soirée d'amour (1895), Quintette des fleurs (1896), Mandolines à la Passante and Cinq Fantaisies, and a Concerto (1898) and a Konzertstück for piano and orchestra.

In 1894 he came into contact with Marcel Proust; they became friends, and he set one of Proust's poems, "Mensonges" (Lies) to music. Delafosse dedicated compositions to both Montesquiou and Proust. Montesquiou called him "The lion of the piano". Both writers would later distance themselves from Delafosse, making him no longer welcome in Parisian literary salons. When a friend suggested to Proust to organize a concert with Delafosse, Proust replied that he would rather not see him: "M. Delafosse, qu'il me serait peu agréable d'avoir chez moi".

Performances and compositions 
Delafosse was known for his interpretations of Chopin and Liszt. He often performed in the drawing room of Countess Saussine, and gave several private recitals at the Salle Érard in 1893/1894. In 1896 Delafosse gave a series of concerts in London with the famous Belgian violinist Eugène Ysaÿe to a mixed reception.

References 

19th-century pianists
French male pianists
French male composers
French Romantic composers
19th-century French composers
20th-century French composers
1874 births
1951 deaths
20th-century pianists
Conservatoire de Paris alumni
20th-century French male musicians
19th-century French male musicians